Armchair Expert is a weekly podcast hosted by American actors Dax Shepard and Monica Padman. Each podcast features Shepard and Padman interviewing celebrities, journalists, and academics about "the messiness of being human". The podcast premiered February 14, 2018, with Shepard's wife, actress Kristen Bell, as the first guest. It appeared on Vulture's list of 2018's best comedy podcasts and got reviewed by The Irish Times. Shepard and Padman have also taken their podcast on the road, recording episodes in front of live audiences.

History
Armchair Expert was launched "on a lark" after Shepard had positive experiences as a guest on other podcasts, appreciating the length of time the format allowed compared to the typical brief segment on a talk show. It was the most downloaded new podcast of 2018 on iTunes. Shepard's goal is to give people the "experience of an AA meeting without them having to become a drunk". He states that he is qualified to host a podcast from his "decade of sobriety, degree in Anthropology, and four years of improv training." Podcasts are recorded in Shepard's guest house attic, and released on Mondays and Thursdays. Shepard is assisted by co-host Monica Padman, who "fact checks" him at the end of each episode from a different perspective. The episodes typically run two hours in length.

In 2020, Forbes named Armchair Expert the fourth highest-earning podcast in the United States, estimating its earnings that year at $9 million, with a monthly audience of 20 million people. On May 12, 2021, Armchair Expert announced on Instagram that the podcast would be available exclusively on Spotify beginning July 1, saying they would continue to maintain the same creative control over the show after the move. On June 18, 2021, on Jimmy Kimmel Live!, Shepard and Padman revealed that former President Barack Obama will be their first guest once the podcast moves to Spotify.

Episodes

2018 episodes

2019 episodes

2020 episodes

2021 episodes

2022 episodes

References

External links
 
 

2018 podcast debuts
Audio podcasts
Comedy and humor podcasts
American podcasts